Bayanzürkh (lit. "rich heart") is a sum (district) of Khövsgöl aimag (province) in Mongolia. In 2000, the sum had 4202 inhabitants, mainly Darkhad.

History 

A Bayanzürkh sum was founded, together with the whole aimag, in 1931. In 1933, the bigger part of that sum became Ulaan-Uul sum. In the same year, Bayanzürkh had about 1,100 inhabitants in 499 households, and about 49,000 heads of livestock. Between 1952 and 1990, Bayanzürkh was the seat of the Soyol negdel.

Economy 

In 2004, there were roughly 110,000 head of livestock, among them 55,000 sheep, 36,000 goats, 13,000 cattle and yaks, 6,000 horses, and 280 camels.

Literature 

M.Nyamaa, Khövsgöl aimgiin lavlakh toli, Ulaanbaatar 2001, p. 29f

References 

Districts of Khövsgöl Province